Alex Edelman (born March 20, 1989) is an American stand-up comedian based in New York City. He is an internationally touring comic and found early success in the United Kingdom where he was named Best Newcomer at the 2014 Edinburgh Festival Fringe. He has toured three shows since 2014: Millennial (2014–2015), Everything Handed to You (2015–2016), and Just for Us (2018–2020).

Biography 
Edelman was born in Boston to Cheryl, a real estate lawyer, and Elazer R. Edelman, a biomedical engineer, cardiologist, and professor. He has two brothers, Austin, and Israeli Olympian Adam Edelman. He was raised in Brookline, Massachusetts. He began performing stand-up at age 15. A baseball fan, he also worked for the Boston Red Sox and Los Angeles Dodgers associations as a teenager.

Edelman grew up in an Orthodox Jewish family and, following high school, spent a year in a yeshiva in Jerusalem. During his time there, he helped to establish the city's first comedy club Off the Wall Comedy. In 2008, he moved to New York City to study English at New York University. He graduated in 2012. During college, he continued to perform stand-up and later joined Upright Citizens Brigade. He first performed in the UK was in 2012 while studying abroad. He made his Australian debut in 2015.

His show "Millennial" won the Edinburgh Comedy Award for Best Newcomer at the 2014 Edinburgh Festival Fringe, the first American to do so since Arj Barker won in 1997. Edelman's 2015 Edinburgh Fringe show was titled "Everything Handed to You", and was the second most well-reviewed show at that year's festival. His 2018 show, Just For Us, was nominated for the Best Show award at the Edinburgh Fringe. He has appeared in the UK on television shows such as The John Bishop Show, Alan Davies: As Yet Untitled, Live from the BBC, Roast Battle, and contributed several anecdotes about his experiences as a comedian to the 2015 book Off the Mic, by Deborah Frances-White and Marsha Shandur. He has done a BBC Radio 4 comedy series called "Alex Edelman's Peer Group".

As a comedy writer, he has contributed to the American television shows The Great Indoors (2016–2017) and Teenage Bounty Hunters (2020). Edelman was the head writer for Saturday Night Seder, a virtual celebrity Passover seder held during the COVID-19 pandemic. He also trained Rabbis to infuse humor into the High Holiday services as part of the Jewish communal response to the pandemic.

Personal life 
Edelman had an on-again, off-again relationship with Canadian comedian Katherine Ryan. He is in a relationship with stand-up comedian and actress Hannah Einbinder.

Works

Shows 

 Millennial (2014–2015)
 Everything Handed to You (2015–2016)
 Just for Us (2018– )

Radio 

 Millennial (2015) – BBC Radio 4
 Alex Edelman's Special Relationships (2018) – BBC Radio 4
 Alex Edelman's Peer Group (2017–2021) – BBC Radio 4

Specials and album 

 Alex Edelman: Live at the BBC (2016) – Netflix UK; hour-long special
 Until Now (2020); album

Awards and nominations

References

External links 

 
 
 
 

American stand-up comedians
Jewish American male comedians
Living people
1989 births
Comedians from Massachusetts
People from Boston
21st-century American comedians
21st-century American Jews
American male comedians